MacNair is a surname.  Notable people with the surname include:

Frances Macdonald MacNair (1873–1921), Scottish artist of the "Glasgow Style" 
Herbert MacNair, Scottish artist
Peter Macnair (born 1940), Canadian anthropologist
Rachel MacNair (born 1958), American sociologist and psychologist

Fictional characters
Jamie Macnair, character in The Curse of the Viking Grave
Sir Kevin Dean de Courtney MacNair of MacNair, alias of a character in Napoleon Disentimed
Walden Macnair, a Death Eater in the Harry Potter series

See also
McNair, surname